Mount Yao, formerly Mount Shiren, is located in west of Pingdingshan, Henan Province.  It lies east of the Funiu Mountains.  It stands in the middle area of inner land, near to the National Way  311, 207, closing to the Zhijiao Railway. The Spring Temple Buddha is in this mountain.

In ancient times, this mount was named "Mount Rao" and recognized as the source place of "Liu", the family name that has large population in China.  Mozi, the famous thinker in China, used live in this mountain; now his home is still remaining there. The mountain had been renamed Shiren since the 1950s and was changed back to the original name Yao in 2008.

References

Mountains of Henan